"Can't Let Go" is a song by Linda Király. It was planned to be the lead single of her debut English-language album Linda Kiraly, which never materialized. The song was produced by Rodney Jerkins.

Music video
The beginning of the music video shows Linda Kiraly in a white dress behind is a white wall. Then in the other shots she wears a black dress.

Reception
Chuck Taylor from billboard gave it a positive review saying. "The beatbox-buxom "Can't Let Go," about a toxic relationship, conjures Natasha Bedingfield with its pure soul/pop template and a hook big enough to catch a mountain bass."

References

2007 songs
Song recordings produced by Rodney Jerkins
Songs written by Rodney Jerkins
Songs written by LaShawn Daniels